Chappel is an unincorporated community in Lamar County, in the U.S. state of Georgia.

History
Variant names were "Chappell" and "Unionville". The community was named after H. A. Chappel.

References

Unincorporated communities in Lamar County, Georgia